The Jawbreakers (stylized as the JAWBreakers) is an American production duo consisting of Justin Timberlake and will.i.am. According to will.i.am, the duo's name stands for "Justin and Will breaks".

Background 
According to will.i.am "I was surprised that I was even going to like Justin Timberlake. Then he turned me into a fan, and I've become a fan. That means you are so talented that you are changing people's vocabulary."

Writing and production credits

References

Record production duos
Justin Timberlake
Will.i.am